The 1986 Ole Miss Rebels football team represented the University of Mississippi in the sport of American football during the 1986 NCAA Division I-A football season. The team won eight games, lost three, and had one tie. It concluded the season with a 20–17 victory over the Texas Tech Red Raiders in the 1986 Independence Bowl. During the season, Ole Miss was charged with recruiting violations and placed on a two-year probation, which was to take away 10 scholarships and bar the team from a bowl game in 1987.

The team's statistical leaders included quarterback Mark Young with 1,154 passing yards, running back Willie Goodloe with 526 rushing yards, wide receiver J.R. Ambrose with 578 receiving yards, and placekicker Bryan Owen with 52 points scored.

Schedule

Personnel

Season summary

Tulane
Ole Miss retired Archie Manning’s jersey

LSU

Ole Miss' first win in Baton Rouge since 1968.

References

Ole Miss
Ole Miss Rebels football seasons
Independence Bowl champion seasons
Ole Miss Rebels football